Warminster station is a SEPTA Regional Rail station in Warminster, Pennsylvania. It serves as the North end of the Warminster Line. The station is occasionally served by passenger trains operated by the New Hope Railroad, which has an interchange just north of the station with Pennsylvania Northeastern Railroad. Original electrification from Hatboro was extended to Warminster on July 29, 1974, replacing the former Reading Company Bonair station. This station is wheelchair ADA accessible.

Description

Warminster station consists of a side platform along the tracks that is wheelchair accessible. The station has a ticket office and waiting room that is open on weekday mornings. There are four bike racks available that can hold up to eight bicycles. Warminster station has a daily parking lot with 562 spaces that charges $1 a day and a permit parking lot with 238 spaces that charges $25 a month.

Train service at Warminster station is provided along the Warminster Line of SEPTA Regional Rail, which begins at the station and runs south to Center City Philadelphia. Warminster station is located in fare zone 3. Service is provided daily from early morning to late evening. Most Warminster Line trains continue through the Center City Commuter Connection tunnel as part of the Airport Line, providing through service to Philadelphia International Airport. In FY 2017, Warminster station had a weekday average of 1,058 boardings and 1,110 alightings.

Station layout

References

External links

SEPTA - Warminster Station
 Station from Google Maps Street View

SEPTA Regional Rail stations
Stations on the Warminster Line
Railway stations in the United States opened in 1974
Railway stations in Bucks County, Pennsylvania